Leocyma is a genus of moths in the family Nolidae first described by Achille Guenée in 1852.

Description
The eyes are naked and lack lashes. The proboscis is well developed. Palpi are upturned, reaching the vertex of the head, and are smoothly scaled. The male's antennae are simple. The thorax and abdomen are smoothly scaled and tuftless. The tibia is spineless. Forewings have non-crenulate cilia.

Species
Some species of this genus are:

Leocyma appollinis Guenée, 1852
Leocyma camilla (Druce, 1887)
Leocyma candace Fawcett, 1916
Leocyma congoensis Holland, 1920
Leocyma discophora Hampson, 1912
Leocyma fustina Schaus, 1893
Leocyma vates Saalmüller, 1891

References

Chloephorinae